Carlos Javier Flores Córdova (born 9 May 1988) is a Peruvian footballer who plays as a midfielder for Carlos A. Mannucci in the Torneo Descentralizado.

Club career
Carlos Flores joined the Alianza Lima first team in January 2007. Later that season on 8 August 2007 he made his Torneo Descentralizado league debut coming on as a substitute in the 1–1 draw away to Sport Ancash. In his third and last match for Alianza he made his first league start, but could not help his side avoid a 1–2 defeat at home to Cienciano. He finished his debut season with only three league appearances.

The following season in January he joined Atlético Minero. In his first season with the Matucana club he made 11 league appearances. The following season Flores scored his first league goal in the 1–3 away win over Hijos de Acosvinchos for Round 8.

Later in January 2012 Carlos Flores joined Real Garcilaso.

International career
Flores was part of the Peru U17 squad that participated in the 2005 FIFA U-17 World Cup.

References

External links

1988 births
Living people
Footballers from Lima
Peruvian footballers
Association football midfielders
Club Alianza Lima footballers
Atlético Minero footballers
León de Huánuco footballers
Real Garcilaso footballers
Comerciantes Unidos footballers
Deportivo Municipal footballers
Carlos A. Mannucci players
Peruvian Primera División players
Peruvian Segunda División players